Artiloxis is a monotypic moth genus of the family Noctuidae. Its only species, Artiloxis vitiosa, is found in Costa Rica. Both the genus and species were first described by Schaus in 1913.

References

Catocalinae
Monotypic moth genera